Alesiaeum or Alesiaion, also called Aleisium or Aleision by Homer and Alesium or Alesion by Stephanus of Byzantium, was a town of Pisatis in ancient Elis, situated upon the road leading across the mountains from Elis to Olympia. It appears in the Catalogue of Ships in Homer's Iliad.

Its site is unlocated.

References

Populated places in ancient Elis
Former populated places in Greece
Locations in the Iliad
Lost ancient cities and towns